Dover High School is a public high school in Dover, Ohio United States, and is the only secondary school in the Dover City Schools district.  Athletic teams compete as the Dover Crimson Tornadoes in the Ohio High School Athletic Association as a member of the East Central Ohio League and Ohio Valley Athletic Conference. The school colors are crimson and gray. The DHS Alma Mater was composed by L. H. Alexander.

Dover's first school house was constructed in 1827 in a forested area on the south side of 4th Street, near the cemetery. There was a separate segregated school on W. Front Street until 1917, at which time Dover's school system became fully integrated.

On May 17, 2018, the city of Dover broke ground for a new $46.2 million school building. The new facility will be built on the site of the current high school on N. Walnut Street. The oldest portions of the school will be demolished, including the 1915 wing and the 1940 section.

Athletics
Dover High School has a longstanding football rivalry with nearby New Philadelphia High School, having played 117 times since 1896. Dover currently leads the series 57–51–9.  Dover fields eighteen varsity teams in the Ohio Valley Athletic Conference.

Ohio High School Athletic Association State Championships
 Boys  Football – 1933 [8],  1999 AP Poll Title 
 Boys Basketball – 1927, 1933 
 Girls Track and Field – 1995 
 Girls Golf – 2014

Notable alumni

 Hunter Armstrong, Olympic swimmer, Men's 4 × 100 Gold medal winner at Tokyo 2020
 James R. Black, American actor and former professional football player
 Frank Ellwood, Collegiate football coach.
 Perci Garner, Professional baseball player
 Ernie Godfrey, Collegiate football coach.
 Monty Hunter, Professional football player
 Frank "Doc" Kelker, Collegiate All-American football player.
 Ray Mears, Collegiate basketball coach University of Tennessee (1962-77)
 Elliott Nugent, Broadway actor, playwright, film director and writer.
 Bob Peterson, director, screenwriter, animator, and voice actor for Pixar. Co-directed the Academy Award Winning movie "Up."
 Trevor J. Rees, Collegiate football player and coach.
 Zack Space, politician, Democrat House of Representatives Ohio 18th District, January 3, 2007 – January 3, 2011
 Jennifer Lahmers, news anchor/tv personality/co-host of “Extra” with Billy Bush.
 Chris Penso, Major League Soccer Referee
 Wilbur Fox, Professional Basketball Player

References
     8 The Ohio High Athletic Association April 2012

External links
 District Website 

High schools in Tuscarawas County, Ohio
Public high schools in Ohio
1915 establishments in Ohio